Harunabad-e Olya (also Romanized as Hārūnābād-e ‘Olyā; also known as Hārūnābād-e Bālā) is a village in Ab Bar Rural District, in the Central District of Tarom County, Zanjan Province, Iran. At the 2006 census, its population was 444, in 101 families.

References 

Populated places in Tarom County